Robert Love (born 1981) is an American software engineer and author.

Robert Love may also refer to:
 Robert Love (soldier) (1760–1845), soldier in the American Revolutionary War
 Robert J. Love, American Korean War fighter ace
 Joseph Robert Love (1839–1914), known as Dr. Robert Love, Bahamian-born medical doctor, clergyman, teacher, journalist, and politician
 Bob Love (born 1942), American basketball player
 Robert Love, American naval historian
 Robert Love, journalist and biographer of Pierre Bernard